The 1950 Purdue Boilermakers football team was an American football team that represented Purdue University during the 1950 Big Ten Conference football season.  In their fourth season under head coach Stu Holcomb, the Boilermakers compiled a 2–7 record, finished in a three-way tie for last place in the Big Ten Conference with a 1–4 record against conference opponents, and were outscored by their opponents by a total of 200 to 143.

Notable players from the 1950 Purdue team included end Leo Sugar.

Schedule

References

Purdue
Purdue Boilermakers football seasons
Purdue Boilermakers football